Noch Velesova  (Ночь Велесова - Night of Veles) is the second live album by the Russian pagan / folk metal band Arkona. It was released on 11 February 2009 through Sound Age Production in Russia and in May–June 2009 through Napalm Records worldwide.

References

Arkona (band) albums
2008 live albums
Napalm Records live albums